The United Democratic Alliance (UDA) is the current ruling political party in Kenya. Their slogan is "Kazi ni Kazi" (All hustles matter) and their symbol is a wheelbarrow. The party, initially called the Party of Development and Reforms, officially changed its name to UDA in December 2020. The party became notable in January 2021, and is allied with William Ruto, the President of Kenya.

The party fielded candidates in March 2021 by-elections. UDA nominated Ruto in the 2022 Kenyan general election, after he announced that he would leave the Jubilee Party in late 2021. Ruto picked Rigathi Gachagua as his running mate for the elections.

In the 2022 general elections, UDA was able to garner 22 out of 47 seats in the Senate and 138 of the elected members of the National Assembly.

The party uses wheelbarrow as the party's symbol which stands for "worth, respect, and dignity of work in pursuit of an unbiased society". The party is founded based on principles of good governance, including; love, unity, freedom, peace, accountability, diversity, justice and equity. The party also has received great support  from the Kenyan population, boasting over 6,942,397 votes from registered members.

UDA's vision is an equitably empowered Kenyan society living in a peaceful and united country. UDA is a member of Kenya Kwanza.

Misinformation on social media 
During the August 2022 General Elections in Kenya, the United Democratic Alliance (UDA) Party's social media  was not spared from misinformation.

A Facebook post claiming that nominated Senator Isaac Mwaura has been appointed the United Democratic Alliance (UDA) party flagbearer for the Kiambu senatorial position was false.

Another  example,  was a viral image that claimed to show Kilifi gubernatorial candidate Aisha Jumwa  pleading to speak at a UDA rally in Malindi. However, PesaCheck confirmed that the image is not of Jumwa, and the claim is false.Additionally, there were false claims that former Prime Minister Raila Odinga was contesting the Elgeyo Marakwet Senatorial seat on a UDA Party ticket. 

There were claims that Mombasa Governor Hassan Joho had threatened to leave the Azimio La Umoja coalition and join UDA following Mike Sonko's clearance to vie for the Mombasa gubernatorial seat. PesaCheck investigated this claim and found it to be false.

References

External links
Independent Electoral and Boundaries Commission
Official website
Southern Africa chapter
UDA Youth

2020 establishments in Kenya
Political parties established in 2020
Political parties in Kenya